A vivarium is an enclosed area for keeping and raising lifeforms.

Vivarium may also refer to:

 Vivarium (monastery), founded by Cassiodorus
 Vivarium (Rome), the location in ancient Rome where wild animals were kept
 Vivarium Inc., a Japanese video game company
 Vivarium (EP), a 2009 release by the rock band Twin Atlantic
 Vivarium Studio, a theatrical company based in Paris
 Vivarium (film), a 2019 sci-fi film directed by Lorcan Finnegan